A referendum on Husni al-Za'im's candidacy for President was held in Syria on 25 June 1949, alongside a referendum on presidential powers. Al-Zaim's candidacy was approved by 99.4% of voters.

Results

References

Syria
1949 in Syria
Presidential elections in Syria
Single-candidate elections
Election and referendum articles with incomplete results